The Review of Politics is a quarterly peer-reviewed academic journal in the fields of politics, philosophy, and history. It was founded in 1939 and is published by Cambridge University Press.

References

External links

Cambridge University Press academic journals
English-language journals
Political science journals
Publications established in 1939
Quarterly journals